Datamatics is an Indian company that provides consulting, information technology (IT), data management, and business process management services. Its services use robotics, artificial intelligence and machine learning algorithms. Headquartered in Mumbai, the company has a presence across America, Australia, Asia and Europe.

The company was incorporated in 1987, offering computer and electronic data processing linked services, and later added information technology enabled services with robotic process automation.

History
On 3 November 1987, the company was incorporated as Interface Software Resources Private Ltd. The name of the company was then changed to Datamatics Technologies Private Ltd. on 18 December 1992.

It then changed its name to Datamatics Technologies Ltd. when it got listed as a public company under the provisions of section 43A of the Companies Act on 13 January 2000.

Mumbai, Nashik, Chennai, Bangalore, Pune and Puducherry
 Asia (excluding India): Philippines and UAE 
 Australia: Australia
 Europe: United Kingdom
 United States: Michigan, New Jersey, Massachusetts and Missouri

Present 
In February 2019, Datamatics Global Services and AEP Ticketing solutions SRL, Italy (AEP) were granted the letter of acceptance (LOA) by Mumbai Metropolitan Region Development Authority (MMRDA) for implementing an automatic fare collection system for 52 stations of the Mumbai Metro Rail project for belongs to Muralidharan don puducherry ₹ 160 crore.

In May 2019, the company's shares rose as much as 19.99% to Rs 107.75, marking the biggest intraday percentage gain for Datamatics since December 2010.

See also
 List of IT consulting firms
 List of Indian IT companies
 List of companies of India

References

Software companies based in Mumbai
Software companies established in 1987
Technology companies established in 1987
Information technology companies of India
Indian companies established in 1987
1987 establishments in Maharashtra
Companies listed on the National Stock Exchange of India
Companies listed on the Bombay Stock Exchange